Johann Silvio Gesell (17 March 1862 – 11 March 1930) was a German-Argentine economist, merchant, and the founder of Freiwirtschaft, an economic model for market socialism. In 1900 he founded the magazine Geld-und Bodenreform (Monetary and Land Reform), but it soon closed for financial reasons. During one of his stays in Argentina, where he lived in a vegetarian commune, Gesell started the magazine Der Physiokrat together with Georg Blumenthal. In 1914, it closed due to censorship.

The Bavarian Soviet Republic, in which he participated, had a violent end and Gesell was detained for several months on a charge of treason, but was acquitted by a Munich court after a speech he gave in his own defense.

Life
Silvio Gesell's mother was Walloon and his father was German, originally from Aachen, who worked as a clerk in the then-Prussian district of Malmedy, now part of Belgium. Silvio was the seventh of nine children.

After visiting the public Bürgerschule in Sankt Vith, he attended Gymnasium in Malmedy. Being forced to pay for his living expenses from an early age, he decided against attending a university and worked for the Deutsche Reichspost, the postal system of the German Empire. Dissatisfied, he began an apprenticeship to his merchant brother in Berlin. Then he lived in Málaga, Spain for two years, working as a correspondent. He then returned to Berlin involuntarily to complete his military service. After this, he worked as a merchant in Brunswick and Hamburg.

In 1887, Gesell relocated to Buenos Aires, Argentina, where he opened a franchise of his brother's business. The 1890 depression in Argentina, which hurt his business considerably, caused him to think about the structural problems caused by the monetary system. In 1891, he released his first writing on this topic: Die Reformation des Münzwesens als Brücke zum sozialen Staat (The Reformation of the Monetary System as a Bridge to a Social State). He then wrote Nervus Rerum and The Nationalization of Money. He gave his business to his brother and returned to Europe in 1892.

After a stay in Germany, Gesell relocated to Les Hauts-Geneveys in the Swiss canton of Neuchâtel. He farmed in order to support himself while continuing his economic studies. In 1900, he created the magazine Geld- und Bodenreform (Monetary and Land Reform), but it failed in 1903 for financial reasons.

From 1907 to 1911, Gesell was in Argentina again, then he returned to Germany and lived in the vegetarian commune Obstbausiedlung Eden, which was founded by Franz Oppenheimer in Oranienburg, north of Berlin. There, he founded the magazine Der Physiokrat together with Georg Blumenthal. It folded in 1914 due to censorship as World War I began.

In 1915, Gesell left Germany to return to his farm in Les Hauts-Geneveys. In 1919, he was asked to join the Bavarian Soviet Republic by Ernst Niekisch. The republic offered him a seat on the Socialization Commission and then appointed him the People's Representative for Finances. Gesell chose the Swiss mathematician Theophil Christen and the economist Ernst Polenske as his assistants and immediately wrote a law for the creation of Freigeld, a currency system he had developed. His term of office lasted only seven days. After the violent end of the Bavarian Soviet Republic, Gesell was detained for several months until being acquitted of treason by a Munich court. Because of his participation with the Soviet Republic, Switzerland denied him return to his farm in Neuchâtel.

Gesell then relocated first to Nuthetal, Potsdam-Mittelmark, then back to Oranienburg. After another brief stay in Argentina during 1924, he returned to Oranienburg in 1927. There, he died of pneumonia on 11 March 1930.

He promoted his ideas in German and in Spanish.

Villa Gesell, a seaside town in Buenos Aires Province, Argentina was founded by his son, Don Carlos Idaho Gesell, who named it after his father.

Economic philosophy
Gesell considered himself a world citizen and was inspired by Henry George to believe that the earth should belong to all people, regardless of race, class, wealth, religion, or age, and that borders should be made obsolete. But his land reform proposal was different from Georgism. He believed that taxes could not solve the problem of rent on land, as taxes could be transferred to tenants. He thought we must abolish the private ownership of land and put free-land reform, a sort of public lease of land, into effect.

According to Silvio Gesell, it is not effective to establish welfare systems without abolishing private ownership of land, because the proceeds of the labor of workers are determined by the proceeds of labor that they can obtain on free land. The benefits gained by the welfare system are not to increase the proceeds of labor that workers can obtain on free land, but rather to increase the proceeds of labor that they can obtain on the lands of landowners. Private ownership of land converts all the advantages of using one's land into cash and it belongs to the landowner. In order not to cancel the effects of welfare policies, Silvio Gesell believed that Free-Land reform was needed.

Gesell based his economic thought on the self-interest of individuals, which he saw as a "natural" and healthy motive, in satisfying their needs and being productive. Gesell believed that an economic system must do justice to individual proclivities; otherwise the system would fail. He believed that this stance put him in opposition to Marxism, which, Gesell considered, proposed an economic system that was against human nature.

Believing that the talent and selfishness of individuals must be taken into account, Gesell called for free, fair business competition, with equal chances for all. This included the removal of all legal and inherited privilege. Everyone should rely only on their abilities to make a living. In the "natural economic order" which Gesell recommended, the most talented people would have the greatest income, without distortion by interest and rent charges. The economic status of the less-talented would improve because they would not be forced to pay interest and rent charges. According to Gesell, this would result in less difference between the poor and the rich. Furthermore, greater average incomes would mean that the poor would have a greater chance of escaping poverty, in part because other poor people would have greater disposable income and spending power.

Some regard Gesell's idea as a negative interest rate policy. The difference between them is that, with the free-money reforms of Gesell, hoarding money becomes impossible because the face-value of money is depreciated regularly. This forces the circulation of money. With negative interest, on the contrary, there is the possibility of hoarding money, because the face value of money is constant and people can use their money as a means of saving. For example, Japan's negative interest rates drove up the sales of safes and strongboxes.

Gesell denied value theory in economics. He thought that value theory is useless and prevents economics from becoming science, and that a currency administration guided by value theory was doomed to sterility and inactivity.

Works
 Gesell, Silvio. The Natural Economic Order Revised edition. London: Peter Owen, 1958.

In German 
 Die Reformation des Münzwesens als Brücke zum sozialen Staat. Selbstverlag, Buenos Aires 1891
 Die Verstaatlichung des Geldes. Selbstverlag, Buenos Aires 1892
 Die Anpassung des Geldes und seiner Verwaltung an die Bedürfnisse des modernen Verkehrs. Herpig & Stieveken, Buenos Aires 1897
 Die argentinische Geldwirtschaft und ihre Lehren. 1900
 Das Monopol der schweizerischen Nationalbank und die Grenzen der Geldausgabe im Falle einer Sperrung der freien Goldausprägung. K. J. Wyss, Bern 1901
 Die Verwirklichung des Rechts auf den vollen Arbeitsertrag durch die Geld- und Bodenreform. Selbstverlag, Les Hauts Geneveys/Leipzig 1906
 Die neue Lehre von Geld und Zins. Physiokratischer Verlag, Berlin/Leipzig 1911
 Die natürliche Wirtschaftsordnung durch Freiland und Freigeld. Selbstverlag, Les Hauts Geneveys 1916; 9. Auflage herausgegeben von Karl Walker: Rudolf Zitzmann Verlag, Lauf 1949 (PDF; 1,4 MB)
 Gold oder Frieden? Vortrag, gehalten in Bern am 28. April 1916. Selbstverlag, Les Hauts Geneveys 1916
 Freiland, die eherne Forderung des Friedens. Vortrag, gehalten im Weltfriedensbund in Zürich am 5. Juli 1917 in Zürich. Selbstverlag, Les Hauts Geneveys 1917
 Der Abbau des Staates nach Einführung der Volksherrschaft. Denkschrift an die zu Weimar versammelten Nationalräte. Verlag des Freiland-Freigeld-Bundes, Berlin-Steglitz 1919
 Die gesetzliche Sicherung der Kaufkraft des Geldes durch die absolute Währung. Denkschrift zu einer Eingabe an die Nationalversammlung. Selbstverlag, Berlin/Weimar 1919
 Das Reichswährungsamt. Wirtschaftliche, politische und finanzielle Vorbereitung für seine Einrichtung. Freiland-Freigeldverlag, Rehbrücke 1920
 Internationale Valuta-Assoziation (IVA). Voraussetzung des Weltfreihandels – der einzigen für das zerrissene Deutschland in Frage kommenden Wirtschaftspolitik. Freiwirtschaftlicher Verlag, Sontra 1920
 Die Freiwirtschaft vor Gericht. Mit einer Einleitung von Richard Hoffmann. Freiland-Freigeld-Verlag, Erfurt/Bern 1920
 An das deutsche Volk! Kundgebung des Freiwirtschaftlichen Kongresses zu Hannover. Freiland-Freigeld-Verlag, Erfurt 1921
 Deutsche Vorschläge für die Neugründung des Völkerbundes und die Überprüfung des Versailler Vertrages. Öffentlicher Vortrag, gehalten in der Aula des Gymnasiums zu Barmen am 20. Dezember 1920. Verlag des Freiland-Freigeld-Bundes, Barmen-Elberfeld 1921
 Die Wissenschaft und die Freiland-Freigeldlehre. Kritik und Erwiderung. Ohne Verfasserangabe erschienen. Erfurt/Berlin 1921
 Denkschrift für die Gewerkschaften zum Gebrauch bei ihren Aktionen in der Frage der Währung, der Valuta und der Reparationen. Selbstverlag, Berlin-Rehbrücke 1922
 Die Ausbeutung, ihre Ursachen und ihre Bekämpfung. Zweite Denkschrift für die deutschen Gewerkschaften zum Gebrauch bei ihren Aktionen gegen den Kapitalismus. Vortrag, gehalten in der Sozialistischen Vereinigung zur gegenseitigen Weiterbildung in Dresden am 8. Mai 1922. Selbstverlag, Berlin-Rehbrücke 1922
 Die Diktatur in Not. Sammelruf für die Staatsmänner Deutschlands. Freiland-Freigeld-Verlag, Erfurt 1922
 Das Trugbild der Auslandsanleihe und ein neuer Vorschlag zum Reparationsproblem. Eine weltwirtschaftliche Betrachtung, eine Warnung vor Illusionen und ein positiver Lösungsvorschlag. Freiwirtschaftlicher Verlag, Erfurt 1922
 unter dem Pseudonym Juan Acratillo: Der verblüffte Sozialdemokrat. 1922 (PDF)
 Der Aufstieg des Abendlandes. Vorlesung, gehalten zu Pfingsten 1923 in Basel auf dem 1. Internationalen Freiland-Freigeld-Kongress. Freiland-Freigeld-Verlag, Berlin/ Bern, 1923.
 mit Hans Bernoulli und Fritz Roth: Das Problem der Grundrente. Einleitende Gedanken zu einer wissenschaftlichen Abklärung. Selbstverlag des Schweizer Freiwirtschaftsbundes, Bern 1925
 Die allgemeine Enteignung im Lichte physiokratischer Ziele. Selbstverlag, Potsdam 1926
 Der abgebaute Staat. Leben und Treiben in einem gesetz- und sittenlosen hochstrebenden Kulturvolk. A. Burmeister Verlag, Berlin-Friedenau 1927
 Reichtum und Armut gehören nicht in einen geordneten Staat. Werkauswahl zum 150. Geburtstag, zusammengestellt von Werner Onken. Verlag für Sozialökonomie, Kiel 2011,

In Spanish 
 Nervus rerum. Selbstverlag, Buenos Aires 1891
 El Sistema Monetario Argentino. Sus Ventajas y su Perfeccionamento. Selbstverlag, Buenos Aires 1893
 La Cuestion Monetaria Argentina. Buenos Aires 1898

See also 
 Gustav Landauer

References

External links
 
 
 Full text of The Natural Economic Order
 Money reform A number of online text related to money reform and interest free money, in several languages.
 Germans get by without the euro
 List of Writings by Silvio Gesell
 
 Texts by other authors about Gesell's ideas of Free Money and Free Land
 John Maynard Keynes in "General Theory of Employment, Money and Interest" by Silvio Gesell
 

1862 births
1930 deaths
Argentine Esperantists
Argentine writers in German
Bavarian Soviet Republic
Freiwirtschaft
Georgists
German communists
German socialists
German anti-fascists
German anti-capitalists
German economists
German emigrants to Argentina
German Esperantists
German libertarians
German merchants
Left-libertarians
Libertarian socialists
Monetary reformers
People acquitted of treason
People from St. Vith
Walloon people